Securus Technologies is a technology communications firm serving department of corrections facilities and incarcerated individuals across the country. The company is a subsidiary of Aventiv Technologies, which in 2020 announced an ambitious multi-year transformation effort to change the company into a technology company for rehabilitation, and to make its products affordable and accessible for consumers. In the past, the company has faced criticism over phone call pricing, data security, and product innovation.

Securus is owned by Beverly Hills-based private equity firm Platinum Equity.

History
Securus was founded as TZ Holdings Inc. in 1986 in Dallas, Texas. The company changed its name from TZ Holdings Inc. to Securus Technologies in April 2009. During the 2010s, Securus was one of a number of companies which provided telephone service to inmates in US prisons. Securus was partially acquired by ABRY Partners from Castle Harlan in 2013 for $640 million. The company was the target of a data breach of about 70 million records of phone calls in July 2015. Since its inception, Securus has acquired 20 government services, software-based businesses, technologies, patents and exclusive partner agreements.

The company was acquired in 2017 by Beverly Hills-based private equity firm Platinum Equity, owned by billionaire Tom Gores. In 2019, Platinum Equity announced plans to reorganize the company as a more diverse technology company, and created Aventiv Technologies as Securus' new corporate parent.

In October 2020, Securus Technologies partnered with Televerde. In this collaboration, Televerde will offer inbound customer service to friends and families of imprisoned people on live support networks, promoting the transition and training Securus users on the use of its goods.

Securus was founded as TZ Holdings Inc. in 1986 in Dallas, Texas. The company changed its name from TZ Holdings Inc. to Securus Technologies in April 2009. During the 2010s, Securus was one of a number of companies which provided telephone service to individuals in US correctional facilities. Securus was partially acquired by ABRY Partners from Castle Harlan in 2013 for $640 million. The company was the target of a data breach of about 70 million records of phone calls in July 2015. Since its inception, Securus has acquired 20 government services, software-based businesses, technologies, patents and exclusive partner agreements.

In July 2015 Securus Technologies announced that it acquired JPay Inc technology and financial services provider.

In mid-January 2020, Aventiv Technologies named Dave Abel as its president and CEO. Abel committed to reform corporate policies and practices, acknowledging the company faced criticism in the past over pricing, data security, product innovation and other issues.

In October 2020, Securus Technologies partnered with Televerde. In this collaboration, Televerde will offer inbound customer service to friends and families of incarcerated people on live support networks, promoting the transition and training Securus users on the use of its goods.

On February 17, 2022, Aventiv Technologies launched an Independent Advisory Board of 11 experts and advocates in reentry, rehabilitation, education, and business. The Advisory Board is chaired by Teresa Hodge, the President and Co-Founder of Mission: Launch, Inc.

Operations
Securus is headquartered in Dallas, Texas with regional offices located in Carrollton, Texas, Miramar, Missouri, and Houston, Texas. The company employs approximately 1,600 people and is reported to have contracts with 2,600 correctional facilities in the United States.

By the end of 2021, Aventiv Technologies deployed over 400,000 tablet devices to incarcerated individuals including 100,000 tablets that Securus Technologies made available to incarcerated individuals in Texas for free, with additional content expected to cover the costs.

Communication costs
Prices for calls vary greatly among institutions, with first-minute charges from over US$5 to 4 cents, and from over US$1 to 4 cents for subsequent minutes. Prices of out-of-state calls were capped by the FCC to around 21 cents per minute; however, instate rates at many jails and prisons continue to be much higher. On December 8, 2021, Aventiv Technologies announced that the average per minute cost of calls made by incarcerated individuals with Aventiv technology was reduced from $0.15 per minute to a record-low $0.13 per minute.

Before recent FCC rate caps came into place, Aventiv Technologies renegotiated close to 200 contracts to eliminate outlier rates, created new technology that cut third-party financial service fees by 30% resulting in a 50% savings for consumers, launched subscription plans that reduce rates by 74% while increasing call time by 58%, and provided 53.2 million free calls totaling 439.7 million free minutes, and 7.4 million free video connections in response to Covid-19. 

In 2017, the company announced its Wireless Containment Solution, which was developed to prevent contraband cell phones from connecting to mobile networks. As of November 2017, the company reported that the Wireless Containment Solution system has blocked 1.7 million inmate calls from prisons.

Criticism and controversy

On May 10, 2018, The New York Times revealed that one of Securus' products can be used to track the location of almost any phone in the US within seconds. Senator Ron Wyden (D-Oregon) has sent letters to the Federal Communications Commission (FCC) and telecommunications companies demanding answers on the controversial surveillance system. In June, 2022, a US Marshal was indicted by the Department of Justice for abusing the product to track people he knew, uploading blank documents and pretending he had authority to track people he had personal relationships with and their spouses. Securus responded to the indictment that they had "discontinued the tool more than four years ago and permanently shut it off. Even when operable, it was only available to users who were granted authorization by a law enforcement agency or facility.  The tool was engineered with safeguards and security protocols, but we also relied on the integrity of law enforcement to operate it ethically. All of this preceded our aggressive, multi-year transformation, and we wouldn’t and won't provide the service ever again, period."

The prison phone industry has been criticized for charging high fees and profiting off of vulnerable inmates. In 2019, New York City passed a bill ensuring 21 minutes of free phone calls for all inmates in New York City jails; before the bill, the phone contract with Securus had generated $5 million in revenue for the city and $2.5 million for Securus.

See also
Managed access (corrections)
Inmate telephone system

References

External links 

1986 establishments in Texas
Companies based in Dallas
Technology companies established in 1986
Technology companies of the United States
Videotelephony
2017 mergers and acquisitions
Private equity portfolio companies